Lars Henrik Jangvall (20 November 1966 in Sundsvall, Västernorrland) is a former Swedish Olympic freestyle swimmer. He competed in the 1988 Summer Olympics, where he swum the 400 m freestyle and 4×200 m freestyle team.

Clubs
Malmö KK

References

1966 births
Living people
Swimmers at the 1988 Summer Olympics
Olympic swimmers of Sweden
Malmö KK swimmers
Swedish male freestyle swimmers
People from Sundsvall
Sportspeople from Västernorrland County